Ivandol is a small settlement in the hills west of Leskovec in the Municipality of Krško in eastern Slovenia. The area is part of the traditional region of Lower Carniola. It is now included with the rest of the municipality in the Lower Sava Statistical Region.

Name
The name of the settlement was changed from Ivan Dol to Ivandol in 1990.

References

External links
Ivandol on Geopedia

Populated places in the Municipality of Krško